George McDade Staples (born December 7, 1947 Knoxville, Tennessee) was an American Career Foreign Service Officer who served as Ambassador Extraordinary and Plenipotentiary to Rwanda (1999-2001), concurrent appointments as Ambassador to Cameroon and Equatorial Guinea (2001-2004) and Director General of the Foreign Service (May 25, 2006-June 27, 2007), Director of the Bureau of Human Resources at the U.S. Department of State and Political Advisor to the Supreme Allied Commander Europe (SACEUR) at NATO in Belgium. He now holds the rank of largely ceremonial rank of Career Minister.

When his parents separated, he moved with his mother and sister to Los Angeles and graduated from Susan Miller Dorsey High School.  Staples received his B.A. in Political Science from the University of Southern California (Major:Political Science; member of the Air Force ROTC) and an M.A. in Business from Central Michigan University.  He and his wife, Jo Ann Fuson Staples, have one daughter, Catherine and consider their permanent home to be in Pineville, Kentucky.

References

1947 births
Living people
Susan Miller Dorsey High School alumni
University of Southern California alumni
United States Air Force officers
Central Michigan University alumni
United States Foreign Service personnel
Ambassadors of the United States to Rwanda
Ambassadors of the United States to Cameroon
Ambassadors of the United States to Equatorial Guinea
United States Department of State officials
Directors General of the United States Foreign Service